Frank Cannon (8 November 1888 – 15 February 1916) was an English footballer who played at inside-right. He played for Hitchin Town, Queen's Park Rangers, West Ham United, New Brompton, and Port Vale. He helped QPR to the Southern League title in 1907–08, and scored in the FA Charity Shield defeat in 1908. He later won the Staffordshire Senior Cup and Birmingham Senior Cup with Port Vale. He was killed in action during World War I, at the age of 27.

Career
Cannon began his career with hometown club Hitchin Town at the age of 15, whilst working for a solicitors. Described as "a dashing player and good dribbler with a fine shot", he joined Southern League club Queen's Park Rangers in April 1907. He helped Rangers to win the league title in 1907–08.

He scored for QPR at Stamford Bridge in the first ever FA Charity Shield game in 1908. His goal cancelled out that of Manchester United's Billy Meredith, and took the game to a replay, which United won 4–0. QPR went on to finish 15th in 1908–09. He moved on to West Ham United for the 1909–10 season, but played just four competitive games, all in January 1901, with his only goal coming in a 5–0 win over Norwich City.

Cannon joined New Brompton for the 1910–11 season, before moving on to Port Vale of The Central League in July 1911. With 18 goals in the 1911–12 season he became the club's top scorer. He helped the Vale lift the Staffordshire Senior Cup in 1912 and the Birmingham Senior Cup in 1913, but lost form during the 1912–13 season and departed the Athletic Ground in the summer of 1913.

World War I
Cannon signed up to fight in World War I, and was transferred from the Bedfordshire Regiment to the 13th (Service) Battalion of the Essex Regiment, known as the West Ham Pals. He rose to the rank of Sergeant Major, but was killed by shrapnel at Ypres on 15 February 1916. The report of his death in a local newspaper contained the following note from QM Sergeant L.P Martin: "The 13th Essex had been in the trenches for sixteen days and were just about to be relieved. He was just ready to leave the trench when several shrapnel shells burst over him, wounding him and several others. Although his wound was rather serious – he was wounded in the back – it was quite thought he would get to England and recover, but I am sorry to say he died on his way to the dressing station about an hour after he was hit". Buried at Potijze Burial Ground, he left behind a wife, Violet, and three children.

Career statistics

Honours
Queens Park Rangers
Southern Football League: 1907–08
FA Charity Shield runner-up: 1908

Port Vale
Staffordshire Senior Cup: 1912
Birmingham Senior Cup: 1913

References

1888 births
1916 deaths
People from Ware, Hertfordshire
English footballers
Association football forwards
Hitchin Town F.C. players
Queens Park Rangers F.C. players
West Ham United F.C. players
Gillingham F.C. players
Port Vale F.C. players
Southern Football League players
Bedfordshire and Hertfordshire Regiment soldiers
Essex Regiment soldiers
British Army personnel of World War I
British military personnel killed in World War I
Burials at Potijze Burial Ground Commonwealth War Graves Commission Cemetery
Military personnel from Hertfordshire